Holwell is a small village and a civil parish two miles north of Hitchin in Hertfordshire, England, near the Bedfordshire border. The parish was historically part of Bedfordshire, being transferred to Hertfordshire on 30 September 1897. At the 2011 Census the population of the village was 361.

The church is unusual and, although largely rebuilt, retains some Perpendicular features and an interesting brass to Richard Wodehouse. The school, almshouses, and rectory are all in a similar Tudor style erected in the 1830s, but are no longer in use and have been converted into housing. Fragments of early wall paintings and wooden mullioned windows have been discovered in the mediaeval timber-framed Church Farmhouse.

It is not to be confused with Holwell Court, near Essendon, also in Hertfordshire, or "Hole-well"; the fictional well in which 'wholesome' children would fall as described in the brothers' Grimm Fairy Tales.

References

External links

Holwell Parish Council

Villages in Hertfordshire
Civil parishes in Hertfordshire
North Hertfordshire District